Fury at Showdown is a 1957 American Western film directed by Gerd Oswald.

Plot
A peace loving ex gunfighter is forced to resume carrying a gun when his girlfriend is taken hostage by an outlaw.

Cast
 John Derek as  Brock Mitchell
 John Smith as  Miley Sutton
 Carolyn Craig as  Ginny Clay
 Nick Adams as  Tracy Mitchell
 Gage Clarke as  Chad Deasy
 Robert E. Griffin as  Sheriff Clay
 Malcolm Atterbury as  Norris
 Rusty Lane as Riley
 Sydney Smith as  Van Steeden
 Frances Morris as  Mrs. Williams
 Tyler MacDuff as Tom Williams
 Robert Adler as  Alabam 
 Ken Christy as  Mr. Phelps

See also
 List of American films of 1957

References

External links

1957 films
1957 Western (genre) films
American Western (genre) films
1950s English-language films
Films based on Western (genre) novels
Films directed by Gerd Oswald
Films scored by Harry Sukman
United Artists films
1950s American films